The Dichopterinae are a sub-family of planthoppers, now placed in the Fulgoridae, erected by Leopold Melichar in 1912.  The recorded distribution is: South America, Africa, Europe (German fossil species) and Asia through to Borneo.

Tribes and Genera
Fulgoromorpha Lists On the Web lists:

Cladodipterini
Authority: Metcalf, 1938 (South America)
 Cladodiptera Spinola, 1839
 Diacira Walker, 1858
 Sclerodepsa Emeljanov, 2011

Dichopterini
Authority: Melichar, 1912
 Dichoptera Spinola, 1839 (type genus - Asia)
 †Wedelphus Szwedo & Wappler, 2006 (Germany)

Dorysarthrini
Authority: Emeljanov, 1979
 Dorysarthrus Puton, 1895 (Africa, Middle East)
 Pibrocha Kirkaldy, 1902 (Sri Lanka, Thailand)

Protachilini
Authority: Emeljanov, 2013 (South America)
 Protachilus – monotypic P. rex Fennah, 1944

References

External links 
 

Hemiptera subfamilies
Hemiptera of Africa
Hemiptera of Asia
Hemiptera of South America
Fulgoridae